The men's 200 metres event at the 2019 Summer Universiade was held on 10 and 11 July at the Stadio San Paolo in Naples.

Medalists

Results

Heats
Qualification: First 2 in each heat (Q) and next 6 fastest (q) qualified for the semifinals.

Wind:Heat 1: +0.3 m/s, Heat 2: +0.3 m/s, Heat 3: +0.3 m/s, Heat 4: -1.3 m/s, Heat 5: -0.3 m/s, Heat 6: -1.1 m/s, Heat 7: -0.8 m/s, Heat 8: -0.6 m/s, Heat 9: -0.5 m/s

Semifinals
Qualification: First 2 in each heat (Q) and next 2 fastest (q) qualified for the final.

Wind:Heat 1: -0.2 m/s, Heat 2: +0.2 m/s, Heat 3: -0.6 m/s

Final

Wind: +0.5 m/s

References

200
2019